The automated boxing scoring system (ABSS) is a research and development project being developed by a group of Australian institutions and private companies. It aims to provide a training aid and unbiased scoring for the sport of Amateur Boxing and potentially other Combat and Martial art sports.

Development organisations
Australian Institute of Sport (AIS).
PWP Designs Pty. Ltd.
Commonwealth Scientific and Industrial Research Organisation (CSIRO).

Previous involvement in the project:
CRC for microTechnology.
Swinburne University of Technology (Melbourne, Australia)
Griffith University (Brisbane, Australia)

Overview
The system uses wireless communication, micro sensors, smart integration, and computer scoring in an attempt to encourage accuracy and safety in the sport of amateur boxing based on a concept initially developed at Griffith University by Kurt Pope. The "boxing suit" also aims to provide a powerful training aid for coaches and sports scientists.

The system allows monitoring of performance in real-time and is able to indicate the location of hits, display basic statistics on hit locations, and the show current score of each boxer. The advanced software package allows further analysis and playback of recorded bouts which allows the boxing coach and sports scientists to analyse and compare bouts blow-by-blow. The system comprises two suits, each of which includes a pair of standard boxing gloves, head guard protector, and thin light weight vests. Each suit has been instrumented to allow detection of impacts.

A new sport derived from boxing but modified for safety, called Box'Tag, is now using the system to score competitions.

See also

References

Automated Boxing Scoring System (ABSS)
Sports Technology - PWP Designs Pty. Ltd.
A wireless-sensor scoring and training system for combative sports - SPIE Abstract.
ABC Radio Australia - Innovations - Transcript of interview with developer.
ABC Radio National - The Buzz - Transcript of interview with developer.
MIT Technology Review
Sydney Morning Herald - Article: Making boxing fairer
ABC TV - Catalyst - Transcript
ABC Radio Australia - Innovations - Transcript of interview with Prof. Allan Hahn (AIS)
Strongarm Boxing - Box'Tag - New sport derived from boxing with an emphasis on fitness safety
Frontiers of sport: CSIRO and AIS forge a partnership
Australian Institute of Sport - Collaborators

Boxing
Sports officiating technology
Combat sports
Boxing in Australia